The Worshipful Company of Grocers is one of the 110 Livery Companies of the City of London and ranks second in order of precedence. The Grocers' Company was established in 1345 for merchants occupied in the trade of grocer and is one of the Great Twelve City Livery Companies.

History 

The company was founded in the 14th century by members of the Guild of Pepperers, which dates from 1180. The company was responsible for maintaining standards for the purity of spices and for the setting of certain weights and measures. Its members included the suppliers of medicinal spices and herbs, who separated forming the Worshipful Society of Apothecaries in 1617.

The guild was known as the Company of Grossers from 1373 until 1376 when it was renamed the Company of Grocers of London. In 1428, two years after building its first hall in Old Jewry, the company was granted a Royal Charter by King Henry VI of England. One of the Great Twelve City Livery Companies, it ranks second in the Companies order of precedence after the Mercers' Company. It is said that the Grocers' Company used to be first in the order, until Queen Elizabeth I, as Honorary Master of the Mercers' Company, found herself in procession, after her coronation behind the Grocers' camel which was emitting unfortunate smells; as a result, the Mercers were promoted.

Today, the Grocers' Company exists as a charitable, constitutional and ceremonial institution which plays a significant role in the election of and supporting the Lord Mayor and the Sheriffs of the City of London. The company's motto is "God Grant Grace". The company also provides banqueting and conference facilities at Grocers' Hall situated in Prince's Street, next to the Bank of England.

Hall 

The earliest known Grocers' Hall was in Poultry, London, then known as Conningshop-lane on account of the three conies or rabbits hanging over a poulterer's stall in the lane. It was built in 1428 on land once owned by Lord Fitzwalter and let out "for dinners, funerals, county feasts and weddings." The roof and woodwork of the hall were destroyed in the 1666 Great Fire and afterwards a new roof was erected on the old walls while Sir John Cutler, 1st Baronet paid for a new parlour and dining room. The hall was again renovated in 1681 by the future Lord Mayor of London, Sir John Moore. A new hall was built on the same site between 1798 and 1802 when part of the garden was sold to the Bank of England for the expansion of nearby Prince's Street. However, frequent and extensive repairs were required due to defective foundations in the building, which was replaced by a fourth hall, completed in 1893 on Prince's Street. The hall survived the Blitz with only minor damage to its north wing, but was almost completely destroyed by a fire in 1965, apparently caused by a lightbulb left on in the grand staircase beneath an oak lintel which smouldered and eventually caught fire. A fifth and final hall was constructed nearby in 1970, also on Prince's Street, which remains the Grocers' home today.

The present Master Grocer is Timothy Coleridge, son of former Lloyd's of London Chairman David Coleridge.

Church
 St Mary-Le-Bow

Affiliations 

Most noticeably the company is responsible for the maintenance of Oundle School at Oundle, Northamptonshire, which uses the Grocers' crest of a camel as its school badge. Other schools which it maintains are the Elms School in Colwall, Herefordshire. Reed's School's Annual Foundation Appeal has been held at Grocers' Hall for over fifty years. Additionally, in 1876 the Company founded the Grocers' Company School, in Hackney, east of the City of London, for the education of "sons of the middle classes". This was transferred into London County Council's control after that authority's formation in 1889 and changed its name to Hackney Downs School; it closed in 1995. The school depicted as its school badge a camel, for the Lower School, and a shield with cloves and the motto of the Grocers' Company for the Upper School; the Camel and Cloves are remembered to this day by old boys of the school through the Clove Club for former pupils. The Grocers' Company now maintains close links with and is the principal sponsor of Hackney's Mossbourne Academy, renowned for its excellent educational standards. The church of St Paul, Homerton in Hackney was founded by the Company in 1890, but became redundant in 1981. The building still displays the company's coat of arms.

The company is also affiliated to HMS Queen Elizabeth, the first of the Royal Navy's new Queen Elizabeth-class aircraft carriers, and with the Coldstream Guards, the British Army's oldest regular regiment.

Eglinton Village in County Londonderry, Northern Ireland, was established by the Grocers' Guild in 1619, under the name of Muff; the local Castle Credit Union adopted the use of the company's crest, as has Eglinton Primary School.

The church of St Mary the Virgin at Northill in Bedfordshire shows the Grocers' coat of arms on a stained glass window by John Oliver. The company commissioned the window in 1664.

See also 
 Guild

References

Further reading 
  1829 history of the company by the Governor of the Bank of England, 1845–1847.

External links 
The Grocers' Company of the City of London
www.liverycompanies.com

Grocers
12th-century establishments in England
1345 establishments in England